A plague doctor was a physician who treated victims of bubonic plague during epidemics mainly in the 16th and 17th centuries. These physicians were hired by cities to treat infected patients regardless of income, especially the poor that could not afford to pay.

Plague doctors had a mixed reputation, with some citizens seeing their presence as a warning to leave the area or that death was near. Some plague doctors were said to charge patients and their families additional fees for special treatments or false cures. In many cases these doctors were not experienced physicians or surgeons, instead being volunteers, second-rate doctors, or young doctors just starting a career. In one case, a plague doctor was a fruit salesman before his employment as a physician. Plague doctors rarely cured patients, instead serving to record death tolls and the number of infected people for demographic purposes.

In France and the Netherlands, plague doctors often lacked medical training and were referred to as "empirics". Plague doctors were known as municipal or "community plague doctors", whereas "general practitioners" were separate doctors and both might be in the same European city or town at the same time.

History 
According to Michel Tibayrenc's Encyclopedia of Infectious Diseases, the first mention of the iconic plague doctor is found during the 1619 plague outbreak in Paris, in the written work of royal physician Charles de Lorme, serving King Louis XIII of France at the time. After De Lorme, German engraver Gerhart Altzenbach published a famous illustration in 1656, which publisher Paulus Fürst's iconic Doctor Schnabel von Rom (1656) is based upon. In this satirical work, Fürst describes how the doctor does nothing but terrify people and take money from the dead and dying.

The city of Orvieto hired Matteo fu Angelo in 1348 for four times at a normal doctor's rate of 50 florins per year. Pope Clement VI hired several extra plague doctors during the Black Death plague to tend to the sick people of Avignon. Of eighteen doctors in Venice, only one was left by 1348: five had died of the plague, and twelve were missing and may have fled away.

Methods and tasks 
Plague doctors practiced bloodletting and other remedies such as putting frogs or leeches on the buboes to "rebalance the humors." A plague doctor's principal task, besides treating people with the plague, was to compile public records of plague deaths.

In certain European cities like Florence and Perugia, plague doctors were requested to do autopsies to help determine the cause of death and how the plague affected the people. Plague doctors also sometimes took patients’ last will and testament during times of plague epidemics, and gave advice to their patients about their conduct before death. This advice varied depending on the patient, and after the Middle Ages, the nature of the relationship between doctor and patient was governed by an increasingly complex ethical code.

Costume 

Some plague doctors wore a special costume consisting of an ankle-length overcoat and a bird-like beak mask, often filled with sweet or strong-smelling substances (commonly lavender), along with gloves, boots, a wide-brimmed hat, a linen hood, and an outer over-clothing garment. However, the costume was not worn by all medieval and early modern physicians studying and treating plague patients.

The exact origins of the costume are unclear but have been dated back to Italy and France. Most depictions come from satirical writings and political cartoons. The beaked plague doctor inspired costumes in Italian theatre as a symbol of general horror and death, though some historians insist that the plague doctor was originally fictional and inspired the real plague doctors later. Depictions of the beaked plague doctor rose in response to superstition and fear about the unknown source of the plague.

Often, these plague doctors were the last thing a patient would see before death; therefore, the doctors were seen as a foreboding of death. It appears that the only contemporary sources which claim witness to this infamous costume are based in Italy during the 17th century. Later sources based in other areas do claim that this costume was in use in their country (most specifically during the Black Death); however, it is possible that they are being influenced by theatre and other works of fiction, already cited in this article.

The typical mask had glass openings for the eyes and a curved leather beak shaped like a bird's beak with straps that held the beak in front of the doctor's nose. The mask had two small nose holes and was a type of respirator which contained aromatic items. The first known observation of the herbal-stuffed beak was during the 1656-1658 epidemic in Rome. The beak could hold dried flowers (like roses and carnations), herbs (like lavender and peppermint), camphor, or a vinegar sponge, as well as juniper berry, ambergris, cloves, labdanum, myrrh, and storax. The herbs right up against the nose inside the beak allowed for the doctor to have both of their hands free in order to examine the patient or corpse. The purpose of the mask was to keep away bad smells such as decaying bodies and the smell taken with the most caution was known as miasma, a noxious form of "bad air". This was thought to be the principal cause of the disease. Doctors believed the herbs would counter the "evil" smells of the plague and prevent them from becoming infected.

The wide-brimmed leather hat indicated their profession, they used wooden canes in order to point out areas needing attention and to examine patients without touching them. The canes were also used to keep people away and to remove clothing from plague victims without having to touch them. The doctor's long robe was made from linen because it was said germs did not stick to linen as easily as other materials. The robe was also sometimes made from goat skin which was said to be stronger against the plague than linen because of its small pores and polished texture. It was heard of for the robe to be sealed with oil or wax for an extra layer of protection so the "bad air" could not seep through the holes of the linen material. Though contemporary theories about the plague's nature were incorrect, it is likely that the costume actually did afford the wearer some immunity. The garments covered the body, shielding against splattered blood, lymph and cough droplets, and the waxed robe prevented fleas (the true carriers of the plague) from touching the body or clinging to the linen. The costume of the plague doctor is the one of the first examples we have of a hazmat suit.

This well known costume now is used as common costume in festivals mainly in Europe and within the art of theatre.

Contract 
A plague doctor's contract was an agreement between a town's administrators and a doctor to treat bubonic plague patients. These contracts are present in European city archives. Their contractual responsibility was to treat plague patients, and no other type of patient, to prevent spreading the disease to the uninfected. A plague doctor had to serve a long quarantine after seeing a plague patient. The doctor was regarded as a "contact" who by agreement had to live in isolation to be quarantined.

Negotiations 
The bargaining which always preceded the final contract often consisted of serious negotiations. For example, the town administrators of Turin in 1630 were considering the terms of an agreement requested by one Dr. Maletto to become their plague doctor. After much negotiating, they instructed their broker representatives to make a fair and prompt deal as soon as possible with this Dr. Maletto. They were told to get the best possible deal for their city, but to be careful not to lose the opportunity of hiring this plague doctor, as it would be difficult to find someone else to perform these dangerous duties at such a low rate.

As an example of the tough negotiating that went on between plague doctors and infected European towns, there is in Pavia an original agreement between one Giovanni de Ventura and the city in their archives that shows a sixteen clause contract that was further amended after it was originally written. Clause one originally showed 30 florins per month for pay but was later modified to be net of living expenses. Clause two was originally that the pay was to be given two months in advance but later modified to monthly. Clause five provided originally a severance pay of two months but later modified that to one month's pay. Clause six said the said master Giovanni shall not be bound nor held under obligation except only in attending the plague patients which was later amplified with ...the doctor must treat all patients and visit infected places as it shall be found to be necessary. Clause seven had to do with full citizenship and the original text was modified with according to how he shall behave himself.

Bernardino di Francesco Rinaldi obtained a clause in his contract when he was hired as plague doctor by the city of Volterra in 1527 that said essentially that the city had the obligation to provide Bernardino with all and everything necessary for his life support (i.e. food, water), and for these living expenses to be paid through the city expenditures.

Reprimands 
In 1527, in the city of Prato, a plague doctor named Stefano Mezzettino was seen attending to other patients without a custodian. The rule in the plague doctor contract was that a custodian must always be with the plague doctor when he visits other patients. This created much danger for the public. He was fined for his illegal act and breaking the rule of the plague doctor contract.

Notable plague doctors 

 The Italian city of Pavia, in 1479, contracted Giovanni de Ventura as a community plague doctor.
 The Irish physician, Niall Ó Glacáin (c.1563?–1653) earned deep respect in Spain, France and Italy for his bravery in treating numerous people with the plague.
 The French anatomist Ambroise Paré and Swiss iatrochemist Paracelsus were also famous Renaissance plague doctors.
 Nostradamus gave advice about preventive measures against the plague, such as the removal of infected corpses, getting fresh air, drinking clean water, and drinking a juice preparation of rose hips. In Traité des fardemens Part A Chapter VIII, Nostradamus also recommended to not bleed the patient.
 John Paulitious was Edinburgh's first plague doctor, but he died in June 1645 only weeks after beginning employment. He was succeeded by George Rae.

Footnotes

References

Primary sources 
 Nostradamus. The Prophecies of Nostradamus, self-published 1555 & 1558; reprinted by Forgotten Books publishing 1973, 
 Nostradamus. Traité des fardemens et confitures self-published 1555

Secondary sources 
 
 
 
 
  (Chapter 4)

Further reading
 Fee, Elizabeth, AIDS: the burdens of history, University of California Press, 1988, 
 Fitzharris, Lindsey. "Behind the Mask: The Plague Doctor." The Chirurgeons Apprentice. Web. 6 May 2014.
 Haggard, Howard W., From Medicine Man to Doctor: The Story of the Science of Healing, Courier Dover Publications, 2004, 
 Heymann, David L., The World Health Report 2007: a safer future : global public health security in the 21st century, World Health Organization, 2007, 
 Kenda, Barbara, Aeolian winds and the spirit in Renaissance architecture: Academia Eolia revisited, Taylor & Francis, 2006, 
 Reading, Mario, The Complete Prophecies of Nostradamus, Sterling Publishing (2009), 
 Rosenhek, Jackie. "Doctor's Review: Medicine on the Move." Doctor's Review. Web. May 2011.
 Pavia city archives Envelope, 458

External links